Brian Alvey (born March 6, 1970 in Falls Church, Virginia) is an American serial entrepreneur, programmer, designer and blogger. He grew up in Brooklyn and now lives in San Francisco where he is the CEO of Clipisode. He is best known for co-founding the blog publishing company Weblogs, Inc. with Jason Calacanis.

Early career

Alvey designed the first TV Guide website in 1995 and was the senior technical member of the in-house team that built the first BusinessWeek site later that year. He continued designing and developing database-driven Web applications for companies including BusinessWeek, Intel, JD Edwards, Deloitte & Touche and The McGraw-Hill Companies. His Tech-Engine career center application has powered over 200 online career centers including XML.com, Computer User, O'Reilly & Associates Network, DevShed, and the Cold Fusion Developer's Journal. He has been the art director of three print magazines and the Chief Technology Officer of Rising Tide Studios where he personally developed The Venture Reporter Network.

Alvey has also built publishing systems for sites designed by Jeffrey Zeldman including the Web design magazine A List Apart (in 1998) and the Kansas City Chiefs. He was the architect of the system that powers the redesigned global network of Capgemini websites.

In 2002, Brian Alvey was the creator and co-host of the Meet The Makers conference, a series of talk show-style events with Jason Calacanis. In 2003 he invented and launched Blogstakes, a sweepstakes application for the blogging community. He was an early investor and chairman of the comic book publishing company ComicMix, which he still advises.

Weblogs, Inc./Blogsmith
On September 23, 2003, Alvey, along with Jason Calacanis and supported by an angel investment from Mark Cuban, co-founded the publishing company Weblogs, Inc. Weblogs, Inc. was home to such blogs as Engadget, Autoblog, and Joystiq. Time Warner's America Online purchased Weblogs, Inc. in October 2005 for $25–30 million. While at AOL, Alvey was named the chief architect of Netscape and lead the development team which turned it into a social news aggregator. In November 2006, AOL also purchased the blogging platform Blogsmith, which Alvey had built to power Weblogs, Inc., for a reported $5 million. At one time, Blogsmith powered 14 of the top 100 blogs.

Crowd Fusion/Ceros
After AOL, Alvey founded Crowd Fusion, a cloud-native content management system (CMS) company. In July 2008, Crowd Fusion raised $3 million from Velocity Interactive Group, Greycroft Partners, Marc Andreessen and Ben Horowitz. Crowd Fusion's platform customers have included TMZ, The Daily, MySpace, Essence, Tecca and Extra.

In June 2012, Crowd Fusion acquired London-based Ceros. Ceros was spun out of Group FMG, a marketing services company based in London and New York. With that deal Crowd Fusion changed its name to Ceros and appointed Ceros CEO Simon Berg as its CEO. Alvey is currently a board advisor and Chief Scientist of Ceros.

Recurrency
Alvey's startup Recurrency was one of seven companies in the Winter 2014/2015 LAUNCH Incubator. Recurrency debuted at the 2015 LAUNCH Conference on March 2 at the Fort Mason Center in San Francisco and on March 4 won Best Incubator Company.

Clipisode
In 2016, Recurrency again joined the LAUNCH Incubator and pivoted  into Clipisode. Clipisode, an app for hosting a 5-minute daily talk show featuring friends and fans, was announced on stage at the 2016 LAUNCH Conference.

References

External links

Brian Alvey's blog
Brian Alvey on This Week in Startups (TWiST)

American male bloggers
American bloggers
Weblogs, Inc.
1970 births
Living people
People from Falls Church, Virginia
American technology company founders
Xaverian High School alumni
Journalists from Virginia
21st-century American non-fiction writers